Dumont Dunes is an area of the Mojave Desert containing large sand dunes, located approximately 31 miles north of Baker, California on California State Route 127. Bordered by steep volcanic hills and the slow running Amargosa River, the region is easily recognized from a distance by its distinctive sand dunes. The elevation here varies from 700 feet, at the river,  to 1200 feet at the top of Competition Hill, the tallest of the dunes.

Most of the dunes are incorporated in the Dumont Dunes Off-Highway Vehicle Area, which is administered by the Bureau of Land Management as a recreational area for off-road vehicle sports, hiking, camping, rock climbing, and rock collecting.

History
Dumont Dunes are named after Harry Dumont of the Pacific Coast Borax Company that built the
historic Tonopah and Tidewater Railroad, to the east, which was in operation between 1905 and 1940. The vegetation here consists of creosote scrub, some annual grasses, and  wildflowers in the spring. The low elevation in the area makes for warm to extremely hot conditions in spring and summer.

Wildlife 
Wildlife native to Dumont Dunes includes the Mojave fringe-toed lizard, which is under watch by the U.S. Fish and Wildlife Service for possible listing as an endangered species.  Such listing could result in restriction or suspension of recreational uses at Dumont Dunes.

See also 
 Baker, California
 Mojave Desert

References

External links

 BLM website for Dumont Dunes Off-Highway Vehicle Area
 Dumont Dune Riders
 Dumont Dunes story

Mojave Desert
Landforms of San Bernardino County, California
Bureau of Land Management areas in California
Off-roading
Dunes of California